Edward Theophilus Nelson (1874–1940) was a British barrister and local politician born in British Guiana. In 1910 he attained fame as the 'coloured barrister' who successfully defended Mark Wilde, accused of the murder of George Storrs at Stalybridge.

Life
Edward Nelson was born on 22 October 1874 in Georgetown, the son of a builder. He studied at St John's College, Oxford, where he was secretary and treasurer of the Oxford Union, and graduated in 1902. He was called to the Bar from Lincoln's Inn in 1904.

In March 1913 Nelson was elected to Hale Urban District Council. He continued to be returned to the council until 1940.

In 1919 Nelson defended Africans accused of rioting in Liverpool. In 1931 he was involved in the establishment of the League of Coloured Peoples.

Nelson died in 1940.

References

External links
 Edward T. Nelson (1874?-1940), Lancashire lawyer

Black British lawyers
1874 births
1940 deaths
Alumni of St John's College, Oxford
People from Georgetown, Guyana
British Guiana people
English people of Guyanese descent
Migrants from British Guiana to the United Kingdom